Lloyd Junior Jaseuavi Kazapua (born 25 March 1989) is a Namibian football player. He plays in South Africa for Chippa United.

International
He made his Namibia national football team debut on 4 January 2014 in a friendly against Ghana.

He was selected for the 2019 Africa Cup of Nations squad.

References

External links
 
 
 Lloyd Kazapua at Footballdatabase

1989 births
Living people
Footballers from Windhoek
Namibia international footballers
Namibia A' international footballers
Association football goalkeepers
African Stars F.C. players
United Africa Tigers players
Highlands Park F.C. players
Baroka F.C. players
Cape Umoya United F.C. players
Chippa United F.C. players
Namibia Premier League players
National First Division players
South African Premier Division players
2019 Africa Cup of Nations players
2018 African Nations Championship players
Namibian expatriate footballers
Expatriate soccer players in South Africa
Namibian expatriate sportspeople in South Africa
Namibian men's footballers